Alice in Wonderland is a 1915 American silent dark fantasy adventure film adaptation of Lewis Carroll's classic 1865 novel, Alice's Adventures in Wonderland, directed and written by W. W. Young and starring Viola Savoy as Alice.

This film version is notable for depicting much of the 'Father William' poem and it includes footage resembling Tenniel's illustration of Father William doing his back-somersault at the front door.

The film was the first Alice film to combine the chapters from Through the looking glass with those of Alice’s adventures in Wonderland. However, most of the looking glass portion is lost.

Plot
Alice lives happily until chasing a White Rabbit. She swims in her own tears and meets a Mouse, a Dodo, and an Owl, who have a Caucus Race. Alice comes face to face with weird men called Tweedledee and Tweedledum (lost footage). She meets the Caterpillar, then runs away and meets the Cheshire Cat. She finds the Mad Hatter and March Hare, who live at a tea party in the woods (lost footage). Alice then meets the Lion and the Unicorn (lost footage). She then meets the Duchess and a Mock Turtle. She then encounters Humpty Dumpty (lost footage). Alice then meets a Puppy, and The Queen of Hearts. They then play an odd game of Croquet, and attend a trial. Alice offends the Queen, who chokes her. Alice then wakes up on the riverbank, where she fell asleep while sitting with her elder sister and discovers that her adventures were a dream.

External links

1915 films
Films based on Alice in Wonderland
American black-and-white films
American silent feature films
1910s fantasy adventure films
Films based on multiple works
Puppet films
Articles containing video clips
American Film Company films
American fantasy adventure films
1910s American films
Silent fantasy adventure films
1910s English-language films